Androsiphonia is a genus of flowering plants belonging to Paropsieae a subfamily of Passifloraceae. It is a monotypic genus consisting of only one species Androsiphonia adenostegia.

Androsiphonia adenostegia  
A. adenostegia (previously Paropsia adenostegia) is the sole member of Androsiphonia. The oldest written record of A. adenostegia dates to 1904. It is described as a shrub or small tree, growing up to 12 feet tall. It is native to forest and rainforests of Sierra Leon, Liberia, Ivory Coast, and Ghana.  It has gray/green flowers and orange fruits. It shows chemotaxonomic similarities with other members of Passifloraceae, supporting its classification, specifically production of Cyclopentenylglycines (2S,10R)-2-(20-cyclopentenyl)glycine.

Its twigs can be used topically as an insecticide or chewed for dental health.

References

Passifloraceae
Malpighiales genera